Carlos Escobar may refer to:
Carlos Escobar (footballer, born 1990) (Carlos Escobar Casarin), Chilean footballer
Carlos Escobar (footballer, born 1989) (Carlos Escobar Ortiz), Chilean footballer